The Illuy or Iluy is a Trope (from Yiddish טראָפּ "trop") in the Judaic Liturgy. It is one of the cantillation marks used in the three poetic books: Job, the Book of Proverbs, and the Psalms.  Accordingly, it is a special mark belonging to the Ta'amei Sifrei Emet (meaning, the accent signs of the books of truth).

Symbol 
The symbol of Illuy is the same as that of Munach, except that the Illuy is positioned above the Hebrew letter, while the Munach is positioned below it.

In the Yemeni tradition the Illuy is also called the "Shofar illuy" . However, "Shofar illuy" means Munach in the Italian tradition.

Description 

The Hebrew word  is a derivative of the word  (meaning "upper" or "top"), hence its position above the letter.

Occurrences 
The Trope Illuy occurs in only three books.

Literature 
 William Wickes: A treatise on the accentuation of the three so-called poetical books on the Old Testament, Psalms, Proverbs, and Job. 1881.
 William Wickes: A treatise on the accentuation of the twenty-one so-called prose books of the Old Testament. 1887.
 Arthur Davis: The Hebrew accents of the twenty-one Books of the Bible (K"A Sefarim) with a new introduction. 1900.

References 

Cantillation marks